Sanjay Yadav, earlier more commonly known as Sanjay Singh Yadav is an author.

Yadav has written The Environmental Crisis of Delhi, The Invasion of Delhi, Portraits of India and a work in Hindi, Dilli par Kabza. He is an internationally acclaimed lyricist – he has been a semi-finalist in the United Kingdom Song Writing Contest for two successive years, 2013 and 2014.

Yadav, the author, has also produced a documentary film The Return of Raja Bhoj – in its Hindi version, Raja Bhoj Ki Wapsi. As an author Yadav has been a contributor to various academic journals in different countries of the world.

Yadav is the Founder and President of the Trumpist Party of India for Equality and Identity.

Education 
Sanjay Yadav's, i e the author's, education is spread over several different countries and several notable institutions. He attended Scindia School, an elite boarding school in Gwalior. During 1967–68 he co-boarded with Mukesh Ambani at Siddharth House, a hostel of Scindia School. Later he attended University of Cambridge. Clare Hall, a Cambridge college, elected him a life-member in 1991. He was also a fellow of Queen Elizabeth House, University of Oxford.<ref nam Yadav holds a doctorate in international politics.

Background 
Yadav, the author, belongs to southern Haryana. His grandfather was the nobleman Chaudhri Babu Ram Yadav, titled as Rao Sahib by Lord Willingdon, the Viceroy and Governor-General of India. His late father was one of the first members of the Indian Police Service from Haryana and served in Madhya Pradesh. One of his brothers, Ajay, was in the Indian Administrative Service, and another, Vijay, is in the Madhya Pradesh cadre of the Indian Police Service.

Work 

The writer founded the Trumpist Party of India for Equality and Identity on 17 January 2017, at an event widely covered by the international media.

 The party seeks to build a collaborative partnership of the wealthy, on the one hand, and the excluded castes, on the other, through extensive rewards to both. It has been inspired by the life of Donald Trump.

Yadav was a speaker at the Delhi Literature Festival 2017.

Yadav's work as an author has been the subject of feature-reports in three principal newspapers of India, i.e. The Times of India, Hindustan Times and The Hindu. The United States' leading daily The Wall Street Journal in its India e-edition, India RealTime, has also commented on him.

The ideas developed in Yadav's first book, The Invasion of Delhi, have been the subject of critical press comment. The author argues that the people of the Delhi-Yamuna basin constitute the indigenous people of the union territory of Delhi and their systematic exclusion from the city is fundamentally unfair. A population explosion caused by deliberately induced migration from far away is responsible for the environmental degradation of the entire middle Yamuna basin. It has been the subject of extensive international reporting. An international environment-related database, noting the relevance of the book to contemporary ecological issues, carries a biographical entry of the author of The Invasion of Delhi. The Environmental Crisis of Delhi is Yadav's latest work. In this study the author categorises contemporary Delhi as an imperial city, similar to its Sultanate, Mogul and British predecessors when ethnic oligarchies with no local roots held sway. The singular objective of today's ruling oligarchies is the appropriation of the land of the middle Yamuna and its allocation to their kin from beyond the Delhi basin. This predatory design, argues Yadav, underlies the ecological threat confronting India's capital city.  The Indian edition of the Wall Street Journal, one of the leading newspapers in the world, has also done an extensive report on the environment book.

Yadav's third work, Portraits of India, is a collection of poems. Extracts from this work received praise from Khushwant Singh, India's premier writer.
Writing in one of his regular weekly columns, Singh remarked that the couplet of one of the poems "sycophancy is a practice in which, modern-day India is very rich" was an accurate summation of the mental state of Indians and "deserved to be quoted". Khushwant Singh's acclamation proved prophetic and Yadav has begun to win international endorsement and recognition. He secured the rank of a semi-finalist in the United Kingdom's Song Writing Contest 2013 for his submission 'Never Love a Woman'.Following this success two of India's premier newspapers, The Hindustan Times and the Hindu, did feature reports on Yadav. His entry for the 2014 contest, 'To None Ever Bound', also secured a semi-finals position.

Yadav’s foray into film-making has yielded two documentaries, The Return of Raja Bhoj, and its Hindi version, Raja Bhoj Ki Wapasi. These films develop themes first argued in his writings, i.e. issues of external hegemony and indigenous subjugation. The setting for the films is Bhopal and the context a proposal to rename the city as 'Bhojpal'. The film-maker shows how the wealth of the city, indeed the entire state, is in the hands of people from far away. Therefore, the proposal to rename the city would be merely cosmetic, unless accompanied by steps to give the local populations a greater share in the wealth of the city and the state.
Both, Yadav's writings and films, are informed by a passionate concern for subject indigenous populations held in bondage by imperial communities of outside provenance. It is wrong to see this interpretation as some sort of diatribe against migrants. Instead, these works should be seen as a depiction of India as a rigidly hierarchical quasi-imperial arrangement where small groups of people from the presidency towns of the Raj-era rule and dominate vast swathes of territory. This is what empires are about; and this is why, he implies, the vast majority of India's population lives in utter destitution. The challenge before India is the transition of this structure to a more democratic system of local control. Essentially, therefore, Yadav's work should be seen as a moving affirmation of the principles of democracy, freedom and liberty.

As a researcher Yadav was associated with Queen Elizabeth House, University of Oxford. He wrote largely on South Asia, especially Afghanistan, where he has travelled in difficult and dangerous conditions of war. One of his papers on Afghanistan has become a landmark. Although written nearly 25 years ago, it continues to be cited and commented upon by strategists from Israel, the United Kingdom and USA. He contributed also to major Indian journals, The Illustrated Weekly of India and The Hindu. Additionally he wrote on the Indian Rebellion of 1857 and this work was the subject of a lecture he delivered at University of Oxford’s South Asian Studies Centre at St Antony's College. Yadav has also made other seminar presentations at University of Oxford. One of these was on the anti-Mandal riots of the 1990s and another on inter-ethnic relations and hierarchies in Delhi. The former has been praised and extensively quoted by former Harvard professor, senator and diplomat Daniel Patrick Moynihan.

Bibliography 
The Environmental Crisis of Delhi
The Invasion of Delhi
Portraits of India
Dilli par Kabza

Documentary films 
The Return of Raja Bhoj
Raja Bhoj Ki Wapsi

References

External links 

 India's migrants

21st-century Indian poets
Poets from Delhi
Living people
Indian environmental writers
Indian male poets
21st-century Indian male writers
Year of birth missing (living people)
Indian Hindus